The Conservative Party (PC), was a political party in Venezuela, founded in 1830.
It was the rival of the Liberal Party.

History
The party very successfully promoted conservative policies during the early days of the Republic. Several of the early presidents of the country were members of the Conservative Party.

List of presidents

United States of Venezuela

Notes

See also
 Federal War
 Dios y Federación
 Liberalism and conservatism in Latin America

Liberal parties in Venezuela
Political parties established in 1840
Political parties disestablished in 1899
Defunct liberal political parties
Defunct political parties in Venezuela